Natalia Trefilova (also Nataliya), born 1 July 1971, is a former freestyle swimmer from the Soviet Union.

Natalia competed at the 1988 Summer Olympic Games in Seoul, Korea, in the 100, 200, 400, & 800 metre freestyles, & the 4 x 100 metre freestyle relay.

Her effort in the 100 metre freestyle saw her finish first in the B Final in a time of 56.48 seconds.

In the 200 metre freestyle, Natalia achieved her best individual result of the meet, finishing fifth in the Championship Final in 1 minute 59.24 seconds.

References

Russian female freestyle swimmers
Soviet female freestyle swimmers
Olympic swimmers of the Soviet Union
Swimmers at the 1988 Summer Olympics
Universiade medalists in swimming
Living people
1971 births
Universiade bronze medalists for the Soviet Union
Medalists at the 1991 Summer Universiade
Sportspeople from Kirov, Kirov Oblast